A lava cone is a type of volcano composed primarily of viscous lava flows. The volcanic cone can contain a convex profile due to the flank flows of viscous lava.

Locations
Lava cones are nearly unique to Bougainville Island in Papua New Guinea, within the Melanesia subregion of Oceania.

However, an unnamed group of seven lava cones is located in the Obul-Samarask upland of southern Georgia, in Western Asia. The cones are early Pleistocene to Holocene in age. Many of the craters have a well-preserved morphology.

Lava cone volcanoes
Tore, Bougainville island, Papua New Guinea
Bagana, Bougainville island, Papua New Guinea
Pago, New Britain, Papua New Guinea
 Unnamed Lava Cone Group, Georgia

See also
Volcanic cones
Volcanoes of Bougainville Island

References

 
Volcanic landforms